Katumbea is a monotypic genus of Tanzanian ground spiders containing the single species, Katumbea oxoniensis. It was first described by J. A. L. Cooke in 1964, and is only found in Tanzania.

See also
 List of Gnaphosidae species

References

Endemic fauna of Tanzania
Gnaphosidae
Monotypic Araneomorphae genera
Spiders of Africa